The Secret Romantic Guesthouse is an ongoing South Korean television series starring Shin Ye-eun, Ryeoun, Jung Gun-joo, and Kang Hoon. It premiered on SBS TV on March 20, 2023 and airs every Monday and Tuesday at 22:00 (KST). It is also available for streaming on Wavve in South Korea and on Viki and Viu in selected regions.

Synopsis 
The series is about an incident that takes place when the owners of a guesthouse called Ihwawon Inn, which breaks stereotypes, and boarders with secrets gather to find Lee Seol who disappeared 13 years ago.

Cast

Main
 Shin Ye-eun as Yoon Dan-oh: the owner of a guesthouse called Ihwawon Inn. She is a livelihood mistress of the Joseon Dynasty, and draws the attention of flower scholars and viewers by portraying a lovely and confident character.
 Ryeoun as Kang San: a student preparing for a martial arts program with a cold atmosphere.
 Jung Gun-joo as Jung Yu-ha: a noble scholar who has a delicate personality that takes good care of the other person's feelings.
 Kang Hoon as Kim Shi-yeol: Dan-oh's best friend and always quarrels with her, but even gives her dating advice.

Supporting

People at Ihwawon Inn 
 Lee Mi-do as Naju: Dan-oh's nanny.
 In Gyo-jin as Yook Ho: the oldest boarder in Ihwawon Inn.

People at Buyeonggak 
 Han Chae-ah as Hwa-ryeong: a gisaeng who runs Buyeonggak, the largest guest house in Hanyang.
 Hwang Bo-reum-byeol as Ban-ya: Jang Tae-hwa's confidant.

People in the government 
 Oh Man-seok as Jang Tae-hwa: a judge of Hanseongbu and an influential figure of Buyeonggak.
 Ahn Nae-sang as Shin Won-ho: the Left State Councilors.
 Hyun Woo as Lee Chang: king of Joseon.
 Kwon Do-hyung as Jang Hyeon: Jang Tae-hwa's son.

People in the palace 
 Gil Eun-hye as Gwiin Park: Lee Chang's concubine.
 Nam Gi-ae as Queen Dowager
 Lee Joon-hyuk as Noh Seong-gil: the king's merchant ship.
 Joo Suk-tae as Kim Hwan: the only person Lee Chang believes in.

Extended 
 Song Ji-hyeok as Choi Jong-soo: Jang Tae-hwa's right-hand man

Special appearance 
 Han Eun-seong as Jung Gil-joon
 Park Hwi-soon as Ong Saeng-won

Production

Development 
On August 30, 2022, Pan Entertainment announced that it had signed a contract with SBS drama division—Studio S, to produce and supply The Secret Romantic Guesthouse worth 13 billion won, The drama will be produced in cooperation with Apollo Pictures.

Casting 
On September 14, 2022, the main cast lineup was confirmed.

Viewership

References

External links 
  
 
 

2023 South Korean television series debuts
Korean-language television shows
Seoul Broadcasting System television dramas
Television series by Studio S
Television series by Pan Entertainment
Television series set in the Joseon dynasty
South Korean historical television series
South Korean mystery television series
South Korean romantic comedy television series